Wade Marshall (1907–1972) was a neuroscientist, noted for his work along with Philip Bard on producing the first map of  the somatotopic organization of the cerebral cortex while working at the Johns Hopkins University. He went from Johns Hopkins to work at the National Institutes of Health (NIMH), where, in 1954, he became the inaugural leader of the Laboratory of Neurophysiology at NIMH, a position he retained until his retirement.

References 
Kandel, E. R. (2007), In Search of Memory: The Emergence of a New Science of Mind, New York: W. W. Norton & Company,

External links 
 Wade Marshall Papers
 Johns Hopkins University Neuroscience Departament
 Cortical representation of tactile sensibility as indicated by cortical potentials, Marshall, W. H.; Woolsey, C. N.; Bard, P.

American neuroscientists
1907 births
1972 deaths
Johns Hopkins University people